Violetta Caldart (born 10 October 1969 in Auronzo di Cadore) is an Italian curler who lives in Chur, Switzerland.

Caldart started playing curling in 1992. She plays in first position and is right-handed.

She coached the Italian team at the 2017 World Women's Curling Championship and at the 2020 World Women's Curling Championship.

Personal life
Caldart is the former manager of Curling Club Dolomiti She is married and has one child.

References

1969 births
Living people
Italian female curlers
Curlers at the 2006 Winter Olympics
Olympic curlers of Italy
Italian curling coaches
Italian emigrants to Switzerland
People from Chur